The Siebel Fh 104 Hallore was a small German twin-engined transport, communications and liaison aircraft built by Siebel.

Design and development
In 1934, the Klemm Leichtflugzeugbau set up a new factory at Halle, for production of all-metal aircraft (as opposed to Klemms normal wood and fabric light aircraft) and transferred the development of a new twin-engined transport, the Klemm Kl 104 to the Halle factory, the type being redesignated Fh 104.  Klemm transferred control of the factory to Fritz Siebel in 1937, the year the Fh 104 prototype first flew.

It had a metal fuselage, plywood covered wings and a hydraulic undercarriage that retracted into the lower part of the engine nacelles. It became known as the 'Hallore' after the name given to those born in that city.

Performance
Fh 104s won long distance flying competitions in 1938 and an example flew 40,000 km around Africa in 1939. It won the principal award in the 1938 Littorio Rally.  During World War II the aircraft was used as a personal transport aircraft by some senior Wehrmacht officers and officials including Adolf Galland, Albert Kesselring and Ernst Udet.  At least 15 aircraft appeared on the pre-war German civil register. It was also used for training of Luftwaffe air crew. A Siebel Fh 104 was flown by famous German pilot and entrepreneur Beate Uhse out of Berlin during the final days of World War II. 

The larger Siebel Si 204 was based on it.

Operators

Czechoslovakian Air Force (Postwar)

 Luftwaffe

Slovak Air Force (1939–45)

Specifications (Fh 104A)

See also

References

Bibliography

Smith, J.R. and Kay, Antony J. German Aircraft of the Second World War. London:Putnam, 1990. .

1940s German airliners
1930s German military transport aircraft
World War II transport aircraft of Germany
Fh 104
Klemm aircraft
Low-wing aircraft
Aircraft first flown in 1937
Twin piston-engined tractor aircraft